Griffenfeld Island, Griffenfeldt Island, or Umanaq ("the mountain in the shape of a heart"), after the name of the highest peak. is an uninhabited island in the Sermersooq municipality in southern Greenland.

History
The island was named after Danish Statesman Count Peder Griffenfeld (1635–1699) by Wilhelm August Graah during his 1829 expedition to the east coast of Greenland. Graah thought that he could see the distant Niviarsiat peaks, on the western side of the Greenland ice sheet, from the highest point of Griffenfeldt Island

Fridtjof Nansen discovered old Eskimo ruins at the foot of Umanaq mountain in 1882.

Knud Rasmussen visited the island in 1932, in the course of his Sixth Thule Expedition and described Griffenfeld Island as "barren and exposed to the fogs and winter ice of the sea".

Geography
Griffenfeld Island is a coastal island located off King Frederick VI Coast in southeastern Greenland, separated from the mainland by a narrow sound. It lies south of the mouth of Sehested Fjord and Kattertooq, and north of the mouth of Timmiarmiut Fjord.

The island's coast is deeply indented and off its shore lie several small islets.

See also
List of islands of Greenland

References

External links
New insights on the north-eastern part of the Ketilidian orogen in South-East Greenland

Uninhabited islands of Greenland
Sermersooq